Cold Call is a 2012 Spanish film directed by Xavi Puebla which stars Antonio Dechent and María Valverde alongside Nick Nolte, José Luis García Pérez, and Héctor Colomé.

Plot 
Desperate in an effort to sell 500 product units in three days in order to avoid losing his job, a salesman of electric appliances (Salva) enlists the help from a convention hostess (Inés) to concoct a plan in order to convince a major North-American customer (Battleworth) during an industry fair.

Cast

Production 
Maestranza Films' Antonio Pérez took over production duties. Shooting locations included Seville.

Release 
The film was presented at the 15th Málaga Film Festival's main competition in April 2012. Its festival run also included the Toulouse Spanish Film Festival. Distributed by Oliete Films, it was theatrically released in Spain on 15 March 2013.

Reception 
Mirito Torreiro of Fotogramas rated the film 4 out of 5 stars, highlighting the great direction of the actors.

 of Cinemanía rated the film 4 out of 5 stars, deeming it to be a "magnificent fable about a loser with no way out" in which Dechent and Valverde perform a "psycho-anthropological transaction".

Accolades 

|-
| align = "center" rowspan = "4" | 2012 || rowspan = "2" | 15th Málaga Film Festival || Silver Biznaga for Best Actor || Antonio Dechent ||  || rowspan = "2" | 
|-
| colspan = "2" | Critics Award ||  
|-
| rowspan = "2" | 17th Toulouse Spanish Film Festival || Best Actor || Antonio Dechent ||  || rowspan = "2" | 
|-
| Best Screenplay || Jesús Gil Vilda, Xavi Puebla || 
|-
| rowspan = "2" align = "center" | 2014 || 23rd Actors and Actresses Union Awards || Best Film Actor in a Minor Role || José Luis García Pérez ||  || align = "center" | 
|-
| 58th Sant Jordi Awards || Best Spanish Actor || Antonio Dechent ||  || align = "center" | 
|}

See also 
 List of Spanish films of 2013

References 

Maestranza Films films
Spanish drama films
2012 drama films
2010s Spanish-language films
Films shot in the province of Seville
2010s Spanish films